Our Currency, Our Country: The Dangers of European Monetary Union is a 1996 book by British Conservative politician John Redwood. In the book, he argues that the European single currency would be a bad idea for the United Kingdom for political, economic and legal reasons.

References

1996 non-fiction books
Finance books
Euro
Currency unions
British non-fiction books
Penguin Books books